This is the list of the number-one singles of the Finnish Singles Chart in 1988.

Chart history

References

Number-one singles
Finland
1988